Éldis Fernando Damasio, better known as Fernandinho (フェルナンジーニョ, born January 13, 1981), is a Brazilian footballer who plays as an attacking midfielder for Gainare Tottori.

Club career statistics 
Updated to 23 February 2020.

References

External links

Profile at Gainare Tottori
Profile at Oita Trinita 

1981 births
Living people
Association football midfielders
Brazilian footballers
Brazilian expatriate footballers
Figueirense FC players
Associação Desportiva São Caetano players
CR Vasco da Gama players
Expatriate footballers in Japan
J1 League players
J2 League players
J3 League players
Gamba Osaka players
Shimizu S-Pulse players
Kyoto Sanga FC players
Oita Trinita players
Vegalta Sendai players
Ventforet Kofu players
Gainare Tottori players
Mogi Mirim Esporte Clube players
Sportspeople from Florianópolis